Dick Matthews is an American former Negro league pitcher who played in the 1930s.

Matthews played for the Monroe Monarchs in 1932. In 16 recorded appearances on the mound, he posted an 11–2 record with a 2.17 ERA over 116.1 innings.

References

External links
 and Seamheads

Year of birth missing
Place of birth missing
Monroe Monarchs players